Allen McReynolds (November 7, 1877 - September 29, 1960) was an American politician from Carthage, Missouri, who served in the Missouri Senate.  He served in the Missouri National Guard.  McReynolds was educated in Missouri public schools and at the University of Missouri.  In 1940, he ran for the Democratic nomination for governor of Missouri.  His daughter Helen Elizabeth married George Rozier, a state senator from Jefferson City, Missouri.

References

1877 births
1960 deaths
Democratic Party Missouri state senators